Kyubeme (Kübüme) is a rural locality (a selo) in Yuchyugeysky Rural Okrug of Oymyakonsky District in the Sakha Republic, Russia, located  from Ust-Nera, the administrative center of the district and  from Yuchyugey, the administrative center of the rural okrug. Its population as of the 2002 Census was 46.

It is located in the Suntar Khayata Range area. The R504 Kolyma Highway passes through the village.

References

Notes

Sources
Official website of the Sakha Republic. Registry of the Administrative-Territorial Divisions of the Sakha Republic. Oymyakonsky District. 

Rural localities in Oymyakonsky District